Gera Central Station is the main station of the Thuringian town of Gera. Gera is one of the largest cities in Germany with no long-distance rail connections and no electrified lines. The station is a significant regional transport hub. The station is classified by Deutsche Bahn as a category 3 station.

History 

The railway was extended in 1859 from Weißenfels to Gera via Zeitz (the Weißenfels–Zeitz and Leipzig–Probstzella lines). At that time, the first station was built at the site of today's Hauptbahnhof as the Prussian station (Preußische Bahnhof), as distinct from the Saxon station (Sächsischen Bahnhof) at today's Gera Süd station. In the following years further lines were built converging on Gera Hauptbahnhof: in 1865 the connection with the Leipzig–Hof line at Gößnitz to the east, in 1871 to Saalfeld in the south-west (Leipzig–Probstzella line), in 1873 to Leipzig in the north (Leipzig–Probstzella line), in 1875 to Plauen in the south (Elster Valley Railway), in 1876 to Erfurt in the west (Weimar–Gera line) and to Zwickau in the south-east (Werdau–Weida–Mehltheuer line), in 1880 to Eisenberg in the northwest (Crossen–Porstendorf line) and in 1883 to Zeulenroda-Triebes and Hof in the south east (Werdau–Weida–Mehltheuer line). Located north of the passenger station was a combined marshalling and yard, connected to a railway depot, both of which are now closed. In 1892, shortly after the opening of the tram network, a facility was built in the freight yard for transferring freight wagons, supported by metre-gauge tram bogies, over the tram lines to factories in Gera. A tram line was opened in 1893 from the station to the central city.

In 1881 the reception building was built by the architects of Hude & Hennicke. During the reconstruction of 1958/63 several ornaments were removed from the facade.

The heyday of the station was between the two world wars, after the glass concourse was completed in 1911. At that time some of the Berlin–Leipzig–Munich traffic ran via Gera and the lines to Saalfeld, Erfurt and Leipzig were double track.

After the Second World War, the second track was removed as war reparations to the Soviet Union.  Gera lost its importance as a junction because of the division of German. The major north-south traffic from Berlin to Bavaria no longer stopped at the station.

After German reunification, some secondary lines were closed down (to Zwickau via Wünschendorf and to Eisenberg), while the building of new infrastructure has also been discussed. Politically, this is highly controversial, especially the Mid Germany Connection (Mitte-Deutschland-Verbindung), running in an east-west direction through Gera.

In the 1990s there were long-distance trains through Gera, but north–south traffic shifted to the electrified, double track and upgraded Saal line through Jena and east–west traffic runs on the electrified, double track and upgraded lines through Leipzig, so now only regional traffic runs through the station. Between 2002 and 2006, a private InterConnex service operated to Berlin and on to Rostock, but in 2006 it was replaced for cost reasons by an electrically operated service, which therefore had to terminate in Leipzig, rather than Gera.

2005–2007 reconstruction 
From 2005 to 2007 the station was extensively renovated and formally re-dedicated in April 2007, shortly before the opening of the 2007 Federal Garden Show. The Gera tramway was reconnected to the station and the Garden Show site at the same time.

Operations 

The following lines of DB Regio, Erfurter Bahn and Vogtlandbahn stop in Gera Hbf (2015 timetable):
Regional-Express (RE) 1: Göttingen–Erfurt–Jena-Göschwitz–Gera–Gößnitz–Glauchau/Elsterberg
RE 3: Erfurt–Weimar–Gera–Ronneburg–Altenburg
EBx 12: Leipzig–Zeitz–Gera–Weida–Pößneck ob Bf–Saalfeld
EBx 13: Gera–Weida–Zeulenroda unt Bf–Mehltheuer–Hof
EB 21: Gera–Hermsdorf-Klosterlausnitz–Jena-Göschwitz–Weimar
EB 22: Leipzig–Zeitz–Gera–Weida–Pößneck ob Bf–Saalfeld (Saale)
VB 4: Gera–Greiz–Plauen–Weischlitz

Tracks 
The station has several tracks, but only six of them have a platform. Trains currently operate (as of 2010) as follows:
Track 1: Trains to Greiz / Plauen / Weischlitz and Cheb
Track 2: Trains to Erfurt / Leinefelde / Göttingen and Mehltheuer / Hof / Regensburg
Track 3: Trains to Leipzig / Weimar / Greiz and Altenburg
Track 4: Trains to Erfurt / Zeulenroda and Saalfeld
Platform 5: Trains to Leipzig / Weimar / Saalfeld
Track 6: trains to Leipzig / Katzhütte / Saalfeld / Chemnitz, and Zwickau

Hauptbahnhof / Theatre bus and tram stop 
The Gera bus station is in front of the station. It is the beginning and end of the regional transport bus routes of the Gera/Land Regional Transport Company (Regionalverkehr Gera/Land GmbH, RVG); the Passenger and Tourist Traffic Company (Personen- und Reiseverkehrs GmbH, PRG); the bus operator, Piehler; the THÜSAC Passenger Transport Company; and the Saale-Orla Rudolstadt Bus Transport Company (Omnibusverkehr Saale-Orla Rudolstadt GmbH, OVS). Since November 2006, the newly opened Stadtbahn (light rail) line 1 of the Gera tramway has run through a tunnel under the platforms of the station.

References

Literature

External links 

 
 

Railway stations in Thuringia
Buildings and structures in Gera
Railway stations in Germany opened in 1859